Smithville School District is a school district located north of the Kansas City Metropolitan Area in Clay County, Missouri.  It currently boasts a student enrollment of about 2500 students (as of 2013 school year).  
The south campus consists of 3 schools, Smithville High School (9-12), Smithville Middle School (7-8), and the Smithville Upper Elementary School (Horizon) (K-6).  The north campus includes only the Smithville Primary (Maple) Elementary School  (K-6). The East Campus consists of Eagle Heights Elementary school (K-6), which opened in 2018. 

The Smithville School District has been consistently Accredited with Distinction, the highest accreditation rating granted by the Department of Secondary and Elementary Education.

In November 2016 Smithville Residents passed these bond questions:

On November 8, 2016, voters in the Smithville School District was asked to consider two questions:  (1) a no tax rate increase bond issue; and (2) a 79 cent increase levy issue. The no tax bond would provide $12.5 million in funds for renovations to Smithville Primary Elementary School, Smithville Upper Elementary School, Smithville Middle School and Smithville High School. In addition, the no tax bond would result in an expansion project at Smithville High School to provide much needed classroom and cafeteria spaces. The 79 cent levy issue will provide just over $20 million in funds for the construction and operation of an additional elementary school.
 
Both questions are intended to provide adequate instructional space and premier learning environments for our growing student population. 
 
Question 1 
Shall the Smithville R-II School District issue its general obligations bonds in the amount of $12,500,000 for the purpose of constructing, improving, furnishing and equipping school facilities, including renovating the Primary Elementary School, classroom additions and renovations at the High School, roofing and asphalt improvements, and security enhancements, resulting in no estimated increase in the District's debt service tax levy?
 
Question 2 
To provide funds for constructing, furnishing, equipping, operating and maintaining a third elementary school, shall the Board of Education of the Smithville R-II School District be authorized to increase the District's operating tax levy ceiling by $0.79 per one hundred dollars of assessed valuation, such levy increase to terminate after the earlier of (1) a period of 25 years, or (2) full payment of any obligations issued to construct, furnish and equip such third elementary school?

Notable faculty
Charlie Cowdrey, high school football coach and became a college coach

Notable alumni
Tommy Thrall, current Cincinnati Reds radio play-by-play announcer

References

External links
Smithville School District website

School districts in Missouri
Education in Clay County, Missouri
Midland Empire Conference